Woodlawn is a village in Jefferson County, Illinois, United States. The population was 698 at the 2010 census. It is part of the Mount Vernon Micropolitan Statistical Area.

Geography
Woodlawn is part of the Mount Vernon Micropolitan Statistical Area.

Demographics

As of the census of 2000, there were 630 people, 241 households, and 185 families residing in the village. The racial makeup of the village was 98.57% White, 0.16% African American, 0.16% Native American, 0.32% from other races, and 0.79% from two or more races.

There were 241 households, out of which 41.1% had children under the age of 18 living with them, 59.3% were married couples living together, 13.7% had a female householder with no husband present, and 23.2% were non-families. 20.7% of all households were made up of individuals, and 9.1% had someone living alone who was 65 years of age or older. The average household size was 2.61 and the average family size was 2.99.

In the village the population was spread out, with 31.4% under the age of 18, 6.7% from 18 to 24, 34.8% from 25 to 44, 16.0% from 45 to 64, and 11.1% who were 65 years of age or older. The median age was 34 years. For every 100 females, there were 88.6 males. For every 100 females age 18 and over, there were 85.4 males.

The median income for a household in the village was $40,000, and the median income for a family was $46,250. Males had a median income of $40,104 versus $19,643 for females. The per capita income for the village was $16,013.  About 8.0% of families and 11.4% of the population were living below the poverty line, including 18.1% of those under the age of 18 and 11.1% ages 65 or older.

Schools 
Woodlawn schools consist of Woodlawn C. C. School District 4, with a K-8 elementary school and Woodlawn Community High School District 205 (183 students, 2011–12).

In recent years, the high school boys' basketball team has reached the 1A state tournament 4 times, placing second in 2009, third in 2011, winning the Illinois High School Association Class 1A Championship in 2012, and bringing home a fourth-place trophy in 2016.

The high school baseball team reached the elite eight in 2011 and 2017.

The high school volleyball team brought home a fourth-place trophy in the Illinois High School Association 1A State Tournament in 2014–2015 school year.

The Woodlawn Grade School Boys track team placed 2nd in the 2022 Southern Illinois Junior High School Athletic Association (SIJHSAA) State Track Meet.  At the 2022 SIJHSAA Class S State Finals, 7th Grader Keaton (Keko) Koch, of Woodlawn Grade School, won the SIJHSAA Class S State Championship in the 100 meter hurdles, the 200 meter dash and the 7th Grade 100 meter dash.  Koch also set state records in the 100 meter hurdles and the 7th Grade 100 meter dash.  

In October of 2022 the Woodlawn Grade School Boys Baseball Team took first place in the SIJHSAA Class S Boys Baseball State Tournament.   That team, coached by head coach Jacob Frick and assistant coach David Remer, had a record of 20 wins and 3 losses.  The team consisted of the following players: Brighym Bequette, Nick Cary, Tyson Frick, Trevor McClure, Ian Bennett, KJ Harrison, James Remer, Dawson Rubenacker, CJ Stewart, Jacob Baum, Lochlyn Bell, Laken Kirkpatrick, Josiah Orrill, Lucas Webb, Bowen Byerley, Austin Chesnek and Trip Oller.  

On February 11, 2023 the Woodlawn Grade School Boys Basketball Team took first place in the SIJHSAA Class S Boys Basketball State Tournament.  That team, coached by head coach Jeff Burkett and assistants Tony Kirkpatrick and Kevin Oller, had a record of 30 wins and 1 loss. (The only loss was to Class L Zadok Casey Jr. High of Mt. Vernon- the eventual SIJHSAA Class L State Champion.) Members of the 2022-2023 Woodlawn Grade School Varsity Boys Basketball team included: Carter Webb, Dawson Rubenacker, Liam Beckham, Laken Kirkpatrick, Colton Jackson, Josiah Orrill, Nick Cary, Tucker Downes, Grayden Shively, Keaton (Keko) Koch, Luke McKay, Trevor McClure (1,000 point scorer), Tyson Frick & Ian Bennett.

References

Villages in Jefferson County, Illinois
Villages in Illinois
Mount Vernon, Illinois micropolitan area
Populated places established in 1876
1876 establishments in Illinois